The Missouri River Valley outlines the journey of the Missouri River from its headwaters where the Madison, Jefferson and Gallatin Rivers flow together in Montana to its confluence with the Mississippi River in the State of Missouri. The valley in the Missouri River basin includes river bottoms and floodplains.

Geography
Other segments are narrow, less than two miles (3 km) wide, with rugged valley sides. Generally, the wide segments trend west-east and the narrow segments trend north-south.

Starting in the state of Montana, the Missouri River Valley travels through North Dakota, South Dakota, forms the shared border of eastern Nebraska and western Iowa, goes into Kansas and then eastward through the state of Missouri. The valley travels through several distinct ecoregions with distinct climate, geology and native species.

The Loess Hills are a unique geographic feature of the valley. The majority of these hills stretch along the east side of the river, from Westfield, Iowa in the north to Mound City, Missouri in the south.

Flooding
Channeling and levee construction have altered how floods affect the Missouri River Valley. Several large floods have affected the valley since Europeans first came into the area. This flood devastated the lower Missouri River Valley, including Kansas City, along a reach of river where there was no levee system. The Kansas City Stockyards were destroyed and the city was forced to move the development of an airport away from the Missouri River bottoms.

Culture

The Missouri River Valley Culture, or "Steamboat Society," was first defined in the 1850s by non-Indian residents of the Dakotas who sold wood to steamboats or trapped furs along the river bottoms. Gambling, prostitution and illegal alcohol sales to American Indians fueled the growth of the culture, which eventually included outfitters, livestock ranchers and tribal agents. A line of urbanized centers grew along the river in response which bloomed when reservations were allotted throughout the region.

Uniting themselves along the banks of the river, South Dakotans identify themselves even today as "East River" or "West River". According to the University of South Dakota, the associated present-day culture of the Missouri River Valley contains a broad swath of political, social, historic, and artistic perspectives.

Management

The Flood Control Act of 1944 introduced the Pick-Sloan Missouri Basin Program. Designed to benefit the entirety of the Missouri River Basin including the valley, the plan sought to meet the needs of residents throughout the area by providing irrigation systems and reservoirs for storing water where needed, along with hydroelectric power, flood control measures, and navigational improvement.

The government did not complete the comprehensive plan for the valley, instead introducing individual projects, including the construction of six dams. They are the Fort Peck Dam in Montana, the Garrison Dam in North Dakota, the Oahe, Big Bend, and Fort Randall Dams in South Dakota, and the Gavins Point Dam in Nebraska and South Dakota. The channel of the Missouri was also improved extensively along with the development of ports such as the one in Omaha throughout the 1950s and 60s for greater volumes of traffic on the river, which have never come to fruition.

Protected areas
Following at a distance of years the first recorded exploration of the majority of the valley by the Lewis and Clark Expedition (1804–1806), there have been numerous attempts at preserving the natural habitats of the Missouri River Valley, spurred in its early days by concerns of duck hunters, for the Missouri basin lies across a major migration toutes, the Central Flyway, and in the river's lower reaches, the Mississippi Flyway. Today there are several protected areas throughout the course of the Missouri River Valley. They include the Theodore Roosevelt National Park, Mark Twain National Forest in Missouri and the DeSoto National Wildlife Refuge in Nebraska. The Katy Trail travels along the valley in Missouri. Other protected areas in the valley include:

 Boyer Chute National Wildlife Refuge 
 Charles M. Russell National Wildlife Refuge 
 Lake Sakakawea 
 Missouri Headwaters State Park 
 Ponca State Park 
 Upper Missouri River Breaks National Monument

See also
 Tributaries of the Missouri River (category)
 Ionia Volcano
 Little Dixie (Missouri)
 River basins in the United States

References

External links
 Missouri River Valley Explorer

Missouri River
River valleys of the United States
Valleys of North Dakota
Valleys of Missouri
Geography of Omaha, Nebraska